Henrik Dahlum (born 9 March 1994 in Kristiansand) is a Norwegian footballer playing for Fløy. He is the son of the former Norwegian international Tore André "Totto" Dahlum.

Dahlum made his debut for Start in Tippeligaen in 2011. Before the 2012 Norwegian season he signed a professional contract with the Norwegian club IK Start. He can play both midfield and forward.

Career statistics

References

Profile of Henrik André Dahlum at NFF 

1994 births
Living people
Sportspeople from Kristiansand
Norwegian footballers
IK Start players
FK Jerv players
Eliteserien players
Norwegian First Division players
Flekkerøy IL players

Association football midfielders